The Shanghai pension scandal was a corruption case in Shanghai, China.

Ultimately, former Shanghai party chief Chen Liangyu was implicated in the scandal and removed from office. Other high-ranking officials were also implicated such as Zhu Junyi, Qin Yu, Yu Zhifei, and Chen Chaoxian. Politburo Standing Committee member and Vice-Premier Huang Ju and his wife Yu Huiwen were also believed to be involved, but were never officially exposed as being part of the scandal.

Allegations

Shanghai's social security fund manages 10 billion yuan in assets. The allegations were that about a third of public funds was diverted into real estate and road investment projects.

Dismissals

Chen Liangyu, the Shanghai Party Chief and Politburo member was sacked from the party in 2006, becoming the most senior party member to be dismissed in a decade. He was accused of illicitly investing billions of yuan of pension fund money in real estate, aiding illegal businesses, shielding corrupt colleagues, and abusing his position to benefit family members. On April 11, 2008, Chen, 61, was sentenced to 18 years in prison for accepting $340,000 in bribes and abusing power, specifically, for stock manipulation, financial fraud and his role in the city pension fund scandal, at the No. 2 Intermediate People's Court, Tianjin.

Also sacked and expelled from the Communist Party were:

 Yu Zhifei, the manager of Shanghai's Formula 1 racing track.
 Chen Chaoxian, a city district chief 
 Ling Baoheng, the director of the Shanghai Asset Supervision Board
 Yin Guoyuan, deputy director of the Shanghai housing, land and resources administration

All those sacked will face criminal charges.

Political context

Chen was seen as a senior member of the Shanghai clique who worked with former CPC General secretary, President Jiang Zemin and were seen as rivals to then CPC General secretary, President Hu Jintao and then Premier Wen Jiabao.  The dismissals were seen as strengthening the authority of Hu and Wen within the party and weakening the Jiang loyalists.

Popular culture

A thinly veiled reference to this scandal is a major plot element of the Chinese TV drama Dwelling Narrowness.

See also
Corruption in the People's Republic of China

References

History of Shanghai
Politics of China
Corruption in China
2006 in China
Scandals in China
2000s in Shanghai
2006 crimes in China